The New South Wales Education Standards Authority (abbreviated as NESA) is the state government education statutory authority with the responsibility for the establishment and monitoring of school standards in the Australian state of New South Wales. It was formed on 1 January 2017 to replace the Board of Studies, Teaching and Educational Standards, 

NESA is also accredited by Australian Curriculum, Assessment and Reporting Authority as the NSW test administration authority for NAPLAN.

NESA is responsible for awarding the secondary school credentials Record of School Achievement and Higher School Certificate.

The NESA Board 
The current chair person is Professor Peter Shergold AC.

See also 

 List of New South Wales government agencies
 Education in Australia

References

External links 

 NSW Curriculum Review

Government agencies of New South Wales
Regulatory authorities of Australia
Education regulators
2017 establishments in Australia